Hakan Demir (born 16 November 1984) is a German politician of the Social Democratic Party (SPD) who was elected Member of the Bundestag for the constituency of Berlin-Neukölln in 2021 federal election.

Political career
In parliament, Demir has been serving on the Committee on Internal Affairs.

Within his parliamentary group, Demir belongs to the Parliamentary Left, a left-wing movement.

Other activities
 Federal Agency for Civic Education (BPB), Member of the Board of Trustees (since 2022)
 German United Services Trade Union (ver.di), Member

References

1984 births
Living people
German people of Turkish descent
21st-century German politicians
Members of the Bundestag 2021–2025
Turkish emigrants to Germany
Members of the Bundestag for the Social Democratic Party of Germany

Members of the Bundestag for Berlin
Politicians from Berlin